Tamil Nadu State Highway 115 (SH-115) connects Cheyyur with Polur. The total length of SH-115 is 105 km.

SH-115 Route: Odiyur (On East Coast Road) - Cheyyur - Melmaruvathur - Vandavasi - Chettupattu - Devikapuram - Polur

External links
 Map of SH-115

State highways in Tamil Nadu